Trump Plaza may refer to:
Trump Plaza Hotel and Casino, Atlantic City, New Jersey (demolished)
Trump Plaza (New Rochelle), New York
Trump Plaza (New York City), New York
Trump Plaza (Jersey City), New Jersey
Trump Plaza (West Palm Beach), Florida
Elite Tower, formerly known as Trump Plaza Tower, Israel (planned)
Trump Plaza and Riverwalk, the park surrounding Trump International Hotel and Tower in Chicago

See also
Trump (disambiguation)
Trump Tower (disambiguation)
Trump International Hotel and Tower

Architectural disambiguation pages